I'm From the City is a 1938 American Western film directed by Ben Holmes who also wrote the story which was adapted into a screenplay by Nicholas T. Barrows, Robert St. Clair, and John Grey. William Sistrom produced the film for RKO Radio Pictures, which also distributed the picture, premiering on August 5, 1938. The film stars Joe Penner, Richard Lane, and Lorraine Krueger.

Cast
 Joe Penner as Peter 'Pete' Pepper
 Richard Lane as Captain Oliver 'Ollie' Fitch
 Lorraine Krueger as Rosie Martindale
 Paul Guilfoyle as Willie
 Kay Sutton as Marlene Martindale
 Kathryn Sheldon as Grandma Hattie Martindale
 Ethan Laidlaw as Jeff, Ranch Foreman
 Lafe McKee as Colonel Bixby (credited as Lafayette McKee)
 Edmund Cobb as Red, Ranch Hand
 Clyde Kenney as Butch, Ranch Hand (credited as Clyde Kinney)
 Hank Bell as Cowboy Near Pig Cage (uncredited)
 Willie Best as Train Porter (uncredited)
 Bud Jamison as Circus Spectator Next to Rosie (uncredited)
 Chris-Pin Martin as Mexican Ranch Hand (uncredited)
 Clarence Nash as Duck (voice) (uncredited)

References

External links

1938 Western (genre) films
1938 films
Films directed by Ben Holmes
RKO Pictures films
American black-and-white films
American Western (genre) films
1930s American films
1930s English-language films